Sarab (also Romanized as Sarāb) is a village in Salami Rural District, Salami District, Khaf County, Razavi Khorasan Province, Iran. At the 2006 census, its population was 647, in 121 families.

References 

Populated places in Khaf County